The ATM Class 4600 and 4700 are a series of articulated trams used by the ATM on the Milan urban tramway network.

They were projected in the 1950s as an articulated version of the series 5300; originally a series of 15 cars (to be numbered from 4601 to 4615) was foreseen, but the two last units were delivered in an experimental ″all electric″ version and, because of that, were numbered in the 4700 series. Some years later a second series of "all-electric" cars was built, numbered from 4716 to 4733.

Originally, the cars were painted in a two-tone-green livery, later repainted in the orange livery, and since 2010 in a white-and-yellow livery.

Bibliography 
 Giovanni Cornolò, Giuseppe Severi: Tram e tramvie a Milano 1840-1987., Azienda Trasporti Municipali, Milan 1987.

External links 

Tram vehicles of Italy
Transport in Milan
Breda trams
600 V DC multiple units